Heartbroken is a psychological thriller by bestselling author Lisa Unger. It is a standalone novel.

Awards and honors
Heartbroken was chosen by New York Daily News, Publishers Weekly Editors and Suspense Magazine as a best new book in 2012.

References

2012 American novels
American crime novels
Novels by Lisa Unger
Crown Publishing Group books